Mirzapur is a city in Uttar Pradesh, India.

Mirzapur may also refer to:

Places

Bangladesh
 Mirzapur Upazila, a upazila of Tangail District
 Mirzapur, Bangladesh, a town in Mirzapur Upazila, Tangail District
 Mirzapur Union, a union council of Gopalpur Upazila, Tangail District

India
 Mirzapur district, a district of Uttar Pradesh
 Mirzapur division, a division of Uttar Pradesh
 Mirzapur railway station, Uttar Pradesh
 Mirzapur (Lok Sabha constituency), Uttar Pradesh
 Mirzapur (Assembly constituency), Uttar Pradesh
 Mirzapur, Bardhaman, a census town in Bardhaman district, West Bengal
 Mirzapur-Bankipur railway station, in Hooghly district, West Bengal
 Mirzapur, Murshidabad, a census town in West Bengal
 Mirzapur, Raebareli, a village in Raebareli district, Uttar Pradesh

Nepal
 Mirjapur, Sarlahi, a village in Sarlahi district

Other
 Mirzapur (TV series), an Amazon Prime Video web series